Sardar, roughly equivalent to "General", is the honorific title used for officers of high rank, ranking Second Brigadier General and higher in the Islamic Revolutionary Guard Corps and commanders of the Law Enforcement Force of Islamic Republic of Iran (Police) who have previously served in the former military or the Islamic Revolution Committees, as well as the commanders of the disbanded Jihad of Construction. Sardars are often graduates of the University of Command and Staff.

The title is equivalent to "Amir" or "Timsar" in the Islamic Republic of Iran Army.

Ranks being addressed by the title include:

See also 

 Rank insignia of the Iranian military

References 

Titles in Iran